USS Sacagawea may refer to the following ships of the United States Navy:

 , was a tugboat, launched in 1942; acceptance by the Navy was canceled in 1942, but she was retained by the Maritime Commission.
 , was a tugboat, acquired by the Navy and renamed in 1942, and struck in 1945.
  is a Lewis and Clark-class dry cargo ship, launched in 2006 and in active service

United States Navy ship names